Francis Carr (12 February 1927 – 23 April 1993) was a member of the Ohio House of Representatives. Carr died of kidney failure while still in office and his widow, Judith Carr, was appointed to complete his term.

References

Democratic Party members of the Ohio House of Representatives
1993 deaths
1927 births
20th-century American politicians